Redoubt Glacier is in North Cascades National Park in the U.S. state of Washington, on the east slopes of Mount Redoubt. Redoubt Glacier descends from the  point on the east slope of Mount Redoubt then has a south terminus near . Melt from the glacier feeds into Depot Creek which flows into Chilliwack Lake. The Depot Glacier lies to the west of Redoubt Glacier.

See also
List of glaciers in the United States

References

Glaciers of the North Cascades
Glaciers of Whatcom County, Washington
Glaciers of Washington (state)